Leonid Hryhorovych Kosakivsky (born 21 January 1950, in Chernivtsi, Ukraine), is a Ukrainian politician. In 1993 to 1998, he was a leading figure in a political life of Kyiv city and became the first publicly elected mayor in the city in modern times.

See also
 List of mayors of Kyiv

References

External links

 Kosakivsky 
 Fedorova, L. Leonid Kosakivsky: "Omelchenko came to power in Kyiv absolutely illegally (Леонид Косаковский: «Омельченко пришел к власти в Киеве абсолютно незаконно»). Glavred. 13 March 2006
 Website of Leonid Kosakivskyi

1950 births
People from Vinnytsia Oblast
Living people
Taras Shevchenko National University of Kyiv alumni
Kyiv Higher Party School alumni
Third convocation members of the Verkhovna Rada
All-Ukrainian Union "Fatherland" politicians
Governors of Kyiv
Mayors of Kyiv